Melanie Florence is a Canadian author of Cree and Scottish heritage.

Writings
Florence lives in Toronto, Ontario, but several of her books are informed by the experiences of her grandfather, who attended one of Canada's infamous residential schools. She writes both fiction and non-fiction for children and young adult audiences. Her books are about historical and contemporary issues affecting indigenous people.

In 2016, Florence was awarded the TD Canadian Children's Literature Award for her picture book, Missing Nimâmâ. The book tells the story of a young, indigenous mother, a missing woman, watching from afar as her daughter grows up. The prize is one of the largest in Canadian children's literature.

Works
Jordin Tootoo: The Highs and Lows in the Journey of the First Inuit to Play in the NHL (Lorimer, 2011)
Righting Canada's Wrongs: Residential Schools (Lorimer, 2015)
Missing Nimâmâ (illustrated by Francois Thisdale, Clockwise, 2015)
One Night (Lorimer, 2016)
The Missing (Lorimer, 2016)
Rez Runaway (Lorimer, 2016)
He Who Dreams (Orca, 2017)
Stolen Words (illustrated by Gabrielle Grimard, Second Story, 2017)

Awards
2012: American Indian Youth Literature Award (for Jordin Tootoo)
2015: Second Story Press's Aboriginal Writing Contest (for Stolen Words)
2016: TD Canadian Children's Literature Award (for Missing Nimâmâ)
2017: Forest of Reading Golden Oak Award (for Missing Nimâmâ)
2018: Ruth & Sylvia Schwartz Children's Book Award (for Stolen Words)

References

External links

Year of birth missing (living people)
Canadian children's writers
Canadian women children's writers
Canadian people of Cree descent
Canadian people of Scottish descent
Writers from Toronto
21st-century First Nations writers
First Nations women writers
21st-century Canadian women writers
Living people